Armando Saavedra (born 27 September 1954) is an Argentine professional golfer. 

Born in Chile, Saavedra worked as a caddie in Buenos Aires, before turning professional in 1974.

Saavedra  won the Argentine Professional Ranking in 1979, but only competed in four major championships, in the British Open in 1979, 1980, 1985 and 1990. He competed on the European Tour from 1978 to 1979 and from 1985 to 1992 and obtained three top ten finishes: T8 at the Scandinavian Enterprise Open in 1979, T5 at the  Peugeot Open de France in 1986 and 7th at the Open Renault de Baleares in 1990. He competed on the Canadian Tour in 1979 and his best finish was third in the Canadian PGA Championship.

In 1985, Saavedra lost in a playoff at the Kentab Open (Sweden).

Saavedra represented Argentina on one occasion in the World Cup in 1987 and finished fourth in the individual competition in Hawaii. He also represented Argentina in the Alfred Dunhill Cup in 1986.

After turning 50, Saavedra competed on the European Seniors Tour in 2005.

Professional wins

Argentine wins (22)
1978 Chaco Open, Jujuy Open
1979 International Bank Grand Prix, Ranelagh Open, La Razon Cup
1982 South Open, Praderas Grand Prix (tie with Vicente Fernández)
1984 San Isidro Open
1985 Acantilados Grand Prix, Abierto del Litoral, Vanguard Grand Prix
1986 Abierto del Litoral, Ranelagh Open
1987 Chaco Open, South American Team
1992 Palermo Grand Prix, Golfer's Grand Prix, Campeonato Metropolitano
1993 Mendoza Open
1994 Argentine PGA Championship
1997 La Plata Open, Abierto del Litoral

Other wins (4)
1986 Iguazu International Open (Paraguay)
1987 São Paulo Open (Brazil)
1992 Colombian Open
2001 Santo Domingo Open (Chile)

Senior wins (5)
2006 Argentine Senior Open, Chaco Senior Open, Jockey Club Rosario Senior Open
2007 Rafaela Senior Grand Prix
2009 Acantilados Senior Open

Team appearances
Dunhill Cup (representing Argentina): 1986
World Cup (representing Argentina): 1987

External links

Argentine male golfers
European Tour golfers
European Senior Tour golfers
1954 births
Living people